Agustín Rodríguez Santiago (born 10 September 1959) known simply as Agustín, is a Spanish retired footballer who played as a goalkeeper.

Club career
Even though he had already trained with the first team, Agustín, a Real Madrid youth graduate, was definitely promoted into its ranks for the 1980–81 season. On 4 April 1981, he benefitted from injury to starter Mariano García Remón to make his La Liga debut, against UD Salamanca.

Agustín conquered the Ricardo Zamora Trophy for 1982–83 (29 matches, 25 goals), but was almost always only a backup, consecutively to Miguel Ángel, José Manuel Ochotorena and Francisco Buyo. In the final stretch of 1985–86, an injury to the second propelled him to the starting job again, and he appeared in both matches of the campaign's UEFA Cup final against 1. FC Köln (5–3 aggregate win).

In his final four years, Agustín partnered Fernando Redondo at CD Tenerife – his teammate would later play at Real Madrid – helping the insular side finish fifth in his third season and qualify for the UEFA Cup for the first time ever. In two consecutive campaigns, his main club would lose the league in the last round after losses against Tenerife, to FC Barcelona.

Agustín retired in 1994 at the age of nearly 35, and had a brief goalkeeping coach spell with his last team.

International career
Agustín played Olympic football for Spain in the 1980 Summer Olympics, being a reserve in all matches. The previous year, he helped the nation reach the last-eight at the 1979 FIFA World Youth Championship.

Honours

Team
Real Madrid
La Liga: 1985–86, 1987–88, 1988–89, 1989–90
Copa del Rey: 1981–82, 1988–89
Supercopa de España: 1988, 1989
Copa de la Liga: 1985
UEFA Cup: 1985–86
European Cup: Runner-up 1980–81

Castilla
Copa del Rey: Runner-up 1979–80

Individual
Ricardo Zamora Trophy: 1982–83

External links

Real Madrid biography 

1959 births
Living people
Spanish footballers
Footballers from Marín, Pontevedra
Association football goalkeepers
La Liga players
Segunda División players
Real Madrid Castilla footballers
Real Madrid CF players
CD Tenerife players
Spain youth international footballers
Spain under-21 international footballers
Spain under-23 international footballers
Spain amateur international footballers
Spain B international footballers
Olympic footballers of Spain
Footballers at the 1980 Summer Olympics
UEFA Cup winning players